South Sea Sinner is a 1950 American adventure film directed by H. Bruce Humberstone and starring Macdonald Carey and Shelley Winters. It is a remake of Seven Sinners (1940). Liberace has a small role.

Plot
A cafe owner on a South Sea island plays a dangerous game of blackmail with a fugitive from justice.

Cast
 Macdonald Carey as 'Jake' Davis
 Shelley Winters as Coral
 Luther Adler as Cognac
 Frank Lovejoy as Doc
 Helena Carter as Margaret Landis
 Art Smith as Grayson
 Liberace as Maestro

Production
South Sea Sinner was known as East of Java during filming. Helena Carter replaced Dorothy Hart. Star Macdonald Carey was borrowed from Paramount.

Filming took place in July 1949. Winters was accused of having a number of temperamental outbursts on set including a clash with Helena Carter. Winters admitted to being "nervous and tired" after making three films in five months and was "unused" to Humbersome's "close direction during song and dance scenes." She said she had to perform "a suggestive dance" when some exhibitors and their families visit the set and she was upset when an eight-year-old boy filmed her; she asked that he be removed to where she couldn't see him.

Reception
The New York Times called it a "ridiculously romance-soggy film which has about as much South Seas flavour as a roadside papaya bar."

Filmink called it "an okay film, not as good as the one it was remaking... most notable for giving a small role to Liberace. Winters gets all the sympathy here... but it is nice to see several scenes where Carter and Winters are friendly to each other...Carter doesn’t seem particularly enthusiastic in this one."

References

External links

1950 films
Films directed by H. Bruce Humberstone
Films scored by Walter Scharf
Films set in Oceania
Remakes of American films
Universal Pictures films
American adventure films
1950 adventure films
American black-and-white films
1950s English-language films
1950s American films